As of 2018, the global grey wolf population is estimated to be 200,000–250,000. Once abundant over much of North America and Eurasia, the grey wolf inhabits a smaller portion of its former range because of widespread human encroachment and destruction of its habitat, and the resulting human-wolf encounters that sparked broad extirpation. Wolf reintroduction programs have been instituted where there is suitable wilderness. Considered as a whole, however, the grey wolf is regarded as being of least concern for extinction according to the International Union for the Conservation of Nature and Natural Resources. Today, wolves are protected in some areas, hunted for sport in others, or may be subject to extermination as perceived threats to people, livestock, and pets.

Wolves tend to quickly adapt to change, and are often referred to as an indicator species; a species delineating an ecoregion or indicating an environmental condition such as a disease outbreak, pollution, species competition or climate change. Wolves do not seem to be able to adapt as readily to expanding civilisation the way coyotes do. While human expansion has seen an increase in the latter's numbers, it has caused a drop in those of the former.

Europe 

Europe as of 2014 – excluding Russia, Belarus and Ukraine – has 12,000 wolves in over 28 countries.
 
Portugal has a stable wolf population of 200–300, which is afforded full protection. Compensation is paid for livestock damage.

Spain's wolf population is estimated at 2,000–3,000 and growing. Their population is concentrated in two autonomous communities: around 700 in Galicia and 1,600 in Castille and León. Wolves are considered a game species, though they are protected in the southern regions of the country, and in February 2021, a hunting ban was enacted in the rural North as well. Compensation is paid for livestock damage, though this varies according to region. The population is expanding southwards and eastwards from the northwest, having recently reached Madrid, Ávila, Guadalajara and Salamanca. A southern relict population has survived in Andalusia, although contrary to the populations in the northwest and centre of the country, it is not doing well.

Italy's wolves are a protected species with current estimates indicating that there are over 2,000 wolves living in the wild. The population is steady. The largest concentrations of wolves occur in the Italian national parks in Abruzzo, mostly in the Abruzzo, Lazio e Molise, in Calabria, in the Pollino and Sila, on Appennino Tosco-Emiliano, and, more recently, on the Alps. Isolated individuals have been sighted in the vicinity of human populated areas such as Tuscany, Bologna, Parma and Tarquinia. Wolves have also been sighted denning 25 miles from Rome, with one small population living in the regional park of Castelli Romani. Currently, Italian wolf populations are said to have been increasing at a rate of 6% a year since the 1970s, though 15% of the total Italian wolf population is reported to succumb annually to illegal poaching and road accidents. Compensation is paid by regional governments for livestock damage. Italy's leading wolf biologist, professor Luigi Boitani of the Sapienza University of Rome, expressed concern that the Italian wolf recovery may have been too successful, due to a large portion of the public refusing to concede to the possibility of rising wolf populations requiring management in the future.

France's population  is 580 individuals, with most packs residing in the forested areas of the Jura and the Alps region. Wolves crossed over into Southern France from Italy through the Alps in the 1990s. Under the Berne Convention, wolves are listed as an endangered species and killing them is illegal. Official culls are permitted to protect farm animals so long as there is no threat to the national population as a whole.

Germany's wolves were first spotted in 1998, and are thought to have migrated from western Poland. In 2007, there were around 200 wolves in 36 packs roaming in Germany, most of them in the eastern German region of Lusatia. In July 2012, for the first time in 150 years, wolves were born in Heidekreis in Lower Saxony, which confirms the spread of wolves from the eastern part of Germany.
 In October 2014 Lower Saxony already had a wolf population of circa 50 animals: 5 packs, all with confirmed pups in 2014, 2 confirmed mated pairs and one territorial unpaired female. By August 2020 the number of packs in Lower Saxony had already risen to 35. By 2020, Germany's total wolf population had grown to about 128 packs, most of them living in Brandenburg, Saxony and Lower Saxony. Under German law wolves are a protected species; in several regions livestock damage compensation programs exist.

In Belgium and the Netherlands wolves were spotted in several locations in 2011. The different lone wolves are probably from the French or Italian populations. Since wildlife corridors and wildlife crossings over highways are being created that connect wildlife areas in the Netherlands, such as the Veluwezoom National Park and the Oostvaardersplassen with the Klever Reichswald in Germany, nature conservation organisations expect wolves to migrate to the low countries in the near future. In 2018, a wolf was recorded in Flanders, Belgium for the first time in over a century. The wolf's radio collar showed that it had come from Germany through the Netherlands, and that it had covered 500 km in just 10 days. In 2022, there were an estimated four wolf packs living in the Netherlands.

In 2020, DNA analysis of sheep killed in Luxembourg confirmed presence of wolves in the country after over a century.

Switzerland's one wolf pack is in the Calanda mountain and there are several lone wolves. Wolves are afforded protection, and livestock damage compensation is paid by Cantons. Swiss authorities gave permission to shoot eight wolves between the years 2000 and 2013.

Liechtenstein has reported one wolf, possibly dispersing from Switzerland.

Norway's wolf population is located in the south-east, close to the Swedish border, and consists of around 100 wolves (roughly a third of which cross the border into Sweden). Wolves are hunted in Norway and the Norwegian Parliament approved an amendment in June 2020 that further reduced protections for wolves.

The Swedish Environmental Protection Agency estimated there were between 289 and 474 in Sweden in the winter of 2019–2020, which is an increase. Wolves are hunted in Sweden, with an aim to keep a sustainable population. The Swedish Environmental Protection Agency states that a minimum of 300 wolves is necessary in order to keep a genetic diversity that ensures long-term sustainability. A total of 24 wolves are planned to be killed by hunters during the winter of 2020–2021, in the regions of Värmland, Örebro, Västmanland and Gävleborg.

In Denmark the last wolf had been shot in 1813, but beginning in 2009 there was speculation that a wolf had crossed the border from Germany due to numerous observations. A wolf that had died from a cancerous tumor was found in 2012; it was the first confirmed in the country in 199 years. In 2013, three different lone wolves were observed in Denmark. According to local biologists, one pair had pups in 2013 based on sound recordings, but the first definite confirmation came in 2017 when an adult wolf with eight pups was filmed. In 2022, 16 adult wolves were known from Denmark (all living in Jutland), including three pairs and two of them had pups that year. Wolves are fully protected and compensation is paid for livestock damage. While the small Danish population originated from wolves that immigrated from Germany, DNA evidence has revealed that Danish-born wolves have also moved to Germany. In 2018, it was estimated that the total population of Greenland wolves was about 200, but with significant uncertainty due to their very remote range. They have been fully protected in Greenland since 1988.

Finland was estimated in 2020 by the National Resources Institute of Finland to contain 216-246 wolves in up to 30 packs. Wolves are legally hunted only in areas with high reindeer densities. Compensation for livestock losses are paid by the state and insurance companies. The population is connected to the large Russian wolf population.

Poland has a population of approximately 2,500 wolves and increasing. Since 1995, they have been a protected species, and compensation is paid for livestock losses.

Estonia has a quite stable wolf population of around 200, down from around 500 in the middle of the 1990s. The official standpoint considers the optimal population to be 100–200. At rough scale the distribution range includes the whole country. In 2007, new version of the law on nature conservation introduced compensation for livestock damage, paid by the state.

Latvia has an unprotected population of 600 wolves, down from 900 in the middle of the 1990s. No compensation is paid for livestock damage.

Lithuania has a population of 300-400 which are increasing in number. The species is not protected, and only insured livestock receives compensation.

Belarus is home to a population of 1,500–2,000 wolves. With the exception of specimens in nature reserves, wolves in Belarus are largely unprotected. They are designated a game species, and bounties ranging between €60 and €70 are paid to hunters for each wolf killed. This is a considerable sum in a country where the average monthly wage is €230. No compensation is paid for livestock losses.

Ukraine has an unprotected, yet stable population of 2,000 wolves. In May 2007, the killing of pregnant females and pups was banned. No compensation is paid for livestock losses. Many of the wolves live in the Zone of alienation north of Chernobyl, where they face few natural threats. This applies equally to the Belarusian part of the zone.

Czech Republic has a stable and protected population of 20 wolves, the livestock damage compensation programme is in place.

Slovakia has a stable population of 350-400 wolves, which are considered a game species, though with some exceptions. No compensation is paid for livestock losses.

Slovenia has a stable population of 40–60 wolves. Since 1991, they have been a protected species, and compensation is paid for livestock losses.

Croatia has a stable population of around 200 wolves. Since May 1995, they have been a protected species, and the deliberate killing of wolves can result in a fine equivalent to $6,000. However, according to Dr. Djuro Huber of the University of Zagreb, illegal wolf killings increased after the protection scheme began, resulting in the deaths of 40 wolves. Compensation is paid for livestock losses.

Bosnia and Herzegovina is thought to have a population of 400 wolves, though they are decreasing in number and are afforded no legal protection. Compensation for livestock losses is not paid.

The former State Union of Serbia and Montenegro has a stable population of 500 wolves, though it is unknown if they are afforded any protection and no compensation is paid for livestock damage.

Hungary has a stable population of 50 wolves, which are protected, though with some exceptions. No compensation is paid for livestock damage.

Romania has an increasing population of 2,500 wolves, which are granted legal protection. No compensation is paid for livestock damage.

Bulgaria has a stable population of 1,000–1,200 wolves, which are granted no legal protection. Wolves are considered a nuisance and have an active bounty on them. No compensation is paid for livestock damage.

Greece has a population of approximately 1,020 wolves, which are legally protected. Compensation is paid for livestock losses, with over 80% of it from insurance.

North Macedonia has an increasing, yet unprotected population of 1,000 wolves, with no livestock compensation programmed.

Albania has a protected population of 250 wolves, which are increasing in number, though no compensation is paid for livestock losses.

Russian wolves have no legal protection and number 25,000–30,000, and are probably increasing in number in some regions, such as Koryak Okrug and Kalmykia. Some villages in Chechnya's Nadterechny district have been reporting increasing wolf numbers since the decrease of military activities. On the other hand, in more populated regions of Central and Southern Russia the number of wolves is very small. In some regions, bounties are paid for the destruction of wolves and dens. Wolves live in comparatively few numbers in the Sikhote-Alin region due to competition with a growing  tiger population. This competitive exclusion of wolves by tigers has been used by Russian conservationists to convince hunters in the Far East to tolerate the big cats, as they are less harmful to livestock, and are effective in controlling the latter's numbers. No livestock damage compensation is paid.

Asia 
In Bangladesh, an Indian wolf appeared after no sightings for 70 years and 450 km eastwards from the nearest population. Another wolf was sighted in 2017 in the same region but on the Indian side of the border. Vast tidal estuaries exist in this area that have not been surveyed for wildlife.

China's wolf population largely lives in areas where little human-influenced change has occurred - the Qinghai–Tibet Plateau, the Mongolia Plateau, and the northeast Plain. In 2003, an estimated 12,500 wolves were living in China. In 2015, wolves were listed as a vulnerable species in the Red List of China’s Vertebrates, with all hunting being banned for this legally protected animal.

India has a decreasing population of roughly 1,000 wolves, which are legally protected. Populations are decreasing due to hunting from farmers. No livestock damage compensation is paid.

Iran has a population of 1,500 wolves. As of 2015 the government pays for livestock killed by wolves. There is also a $3,000 fine for hunting wolves.

Iraq has a stable population of around 115 wolves; no livestock compensation is paid.

Israel has a stable population of approximately 150 protected Indian and Arabian wolves. Some livestock damage compensation paid. Israel's wolves are legally protected under the 1955 Wildlife Protection Law.

Jordan has an unprotected, unknown number of wolves, thought to be roughly numbering 200. The population is decreasing due to hunting. No livestock damage compensation is paid.

Kazakhstan has a stable population of about 30,000 wolves. About 2,000 are killed yearly for a $40 bounty, though the animal's numbers have risen sharply. No livestock damage compensation is paid.

Kyrgyzstan has a stable population of 4,000 wolves, which are unprotected. No livestock damage compensation is paid.

Lebanon has a population of about 50 wolves. Wolves are afforded no legal protection, nor is livestock damage compensation paid.

Mongolia has a stable population of 10,000–20,000 wolves, which are given no legal protection, nor is livestock damage compensation paid.

Nepal had at least 40 instances of wolf presence in the 2010s, with evidence that they are recovering.

Pakistan has an estimated population of at least 365-415 wolves: 350 - 400 across Gilgit-Baltistan, and at least 15 in South Waziristan.

Saudi Arabia has a stable population of 250 to 700 wolves, which are given no legal protection. No livestock damage compensation is paid.

Syria has an unprotected, unknown number of wolves, thought to be roughly numbering 200. No livestock damage compensation is paid.

Tajikistan has a population of 1,700 wolves in 2016, which are stable and unprotected.

Turkey has a population of about 7,000. The wolf can be found in central, northern, and eastern Anatolia away from coastal areas and at altitudes above 900 metres. It has recently begun to re-establish itself in western Anatolia.

Turkmenistan has a stable population of 1,000 wolves, which are unprotected. No livestock damage compensation is paid.

Uzbekistan has a stable population of 2,000 wolves, which are unprotected. No livestock damage compensation is paid.

There are currently no recent or reliable estimates on wolf populations in Afghanistan or Bhutan.

North America 

Canada has over 60,000 wolves, which are legally considered a big game species, though they are afforded protection in 3% of Canada's territory. The Northwest Territories, Nunavut and Yukon have 5,000 wolves each, British Columbia has 8,500 wolves, Alberta 7,000, Saskatchewan 4,300, Manitoba 4,000-6,000, Ontario 9,000, Quebec 5,000 and Labrador 2,000. Canada currently has no livestock damage compensation programmes. In the fall of 2012, the government of British Columbia was considering a cull of the wolf population in some areas. In the winter of 2015 the government of British Columbia began undertaking a cull of up to 184 wolves in an effort to combat dwindling caribou populations in the South Selkirk Mountains and the South Peace region. The cull, like ones before it, was opposed by certain environmental groups.

On 12 March 2012, a Labrador wolf, mistakenly thought to be a coyote, was shot in Newfoundland. It was the first confirmed Labrador wolf in Newfoundland since ca. 1930.

, the United States has up to 18,000 wolves, about two thirds of which are in Alaska. They are increasing in number in all their ranges. Usually, however, wolves in the United States are mostly seen during the winter months in northern Minnesota, northern Wisconsin, Michigan's Upper Peninsula, and portions of Washington, Idaho, northern Oregon, northwest Wyoming, and Montana, as the majority of wolf populations migrate from Canada to the Northwestern states and some of the Midwestern and Great Lakes States during the winter months for the competition over eating bison, elk, white tailed deer and other large ungulates, disputed between other carnivores such as grizzly bear, cougar, and coyote. Wolf recovery has been so successful that the United States Fish & Wildlife Service removed the western gray wolf from the federal endangered species list on March 28, 2008. Due to the controversy over wolf shootings, a coalition of environmental groups sued the federal government to put the gray wolf back on the Endangered Species list.
On July 18, 2008, a federal judge ruled in favor of renewed endangered species protection.
Alaska has a stable population of 10,500-12,000 wolves, which are legally hunted from August to April (in deer-rich areas) as a big game species.

Minnesota has a population of 4,100 wolves, which are legally protected, though they are occasionally culled for depredation control. Minnesota used to have control over its wolf population, but this was revoked by a federal appellate court on August 1, 2017, making wolf management the charge of the federal government. The court decided to retain the state's minimum population of 1,600 animals. It has been argued by state officials that management should remain in the hands of the state, allowing for the wolf to be removed from protected status, since the population has exceeded recovery goals for more than 25 years.

Both Wisconsin and Michigan have healthy populations of 750 each. On December 19, 2014, all wolves in states of Michigan, Wisconsin, and Minnesota became protected again under the U.S. Endangered Species Act.

The Northern Rocky Mountain states (Wyoming, Idaho and Montana) have an approximate population of 1,657 wolves in 282 packs (including 85 breeding pairs). In 1995, wolves were reintroduced to Yellowstone National Park.

Two gray wolves were captured in north-central Washington state in July 2008, one of which was a nursing female. This was the first evidence of reproducing wolves in the state since the 1930s. As of the end of 2014, Washington has at least 68 wolves in 16 packs with 5 breeding pairs.

In northeast Oregon, also in July 2008, wolf howls were heard by biologists who identified at least two adults and two pups. This was the first confirmed breeding pair in Oregon. By December 2011, Oregon's gray wolf population had grown to 24. Wolf OR-7 became the first wolf west of the Cascades in Oregon since the last bounty was claimed in 1947. Oregon's wolf population increased to 77 wolves in 15 packs with 8 breeding pairs as of the end of 2015. As a result, Oregon Department of Fish and Wildlife proposed to delist wolves from their protected species list. On January 14, 2009, the United States Department of the Interior removed the gray wolf from the Endangered Species List in every American state except Wyoming. This move was blocked by lawsuits filed by conservation groups, but was successfully delisted on April 15, 2011 by the US Congress as part of a budget bill.
On August 31, 2012, Governor Matt Mead of Wyoming announced that wolves were no longer on the endangered species list in the state of Wyoming; therefore, they no longer need special protections from the US Fish and Wildlife Service. The wolf population in Wyoming was then controlled by the state. But on September 23, 2014, wolves in Wyoming were again listed as nonessential experimental population under the Endangered Species Act.

In 2011, Wolf OR-7 became the first wolf to return to California. As of 2021, the state has at least two breeding packs: the Lassen Pack and the Whaleback Pack. A third pack, the Shasta Pack, was last detected in 2015.

Wolves from the Greater Yellowstone Ecosystem have dispersed into Colorado several times in the 21st Century. In 2021, scientists documented the first litter of pups born to wolves in the state since the wolves' original extirpation. This resident wolf pack is monitored by Colorado Parks & Wildlife. In 2020, voters narrowly approved wolf reintroduction into the state. The reintroduction plan is underway.

Occasionally, wolves from Canada disperse into Upstate New York. This has been officially confirmed three times in the 21st Century. The most recent wolf to enter New York was killed by a hunter who mistook it for a coyote.

, the Northwestern United States, with the exception of Alaska, has an estimated population of 1,802 wolves.

On October 27, 2014, a collared wolflike canid was seen in north of Grand Canyon, and in November 2014, the same animal was videoed. It was later confirmed to be a northwestern wolf from the Northern Rocky Mountains on November 21, 2014. On December 28, 2014, it was shot dead in southwestern Utah near the Arizona border.

On October 29, 2020, it was announced that the gray wolf would be delisted from the Endangered Species Act. Wildlife advocates worried that this action will jeopardize the recovery of the species throughout the United States. President Joe Biden said he would review the decision by President Donald Trump. Noting that the delisting had been in the works for many years, the Biden administration supported the removal of protections. As part of the 2020 elections, voters in Colorado narrowly voted to deliberately reintroduce wolves to the state.

The wolf was extirpated from Mexico in the 1970s, when the U.S. and Mexican governments cooperated to capture all remaining wild Mexican wolves and initiate a captive-breeding program in an attempt to save the local subspecies. The Mexican Wolf was reintroduced into the Apache-Sitgreaves National Forest in Arizona in 1998 as part of a captive breeding program. There were at least 42 wild Mexican wolves in the southwest United States in 2008. In 2014, there were around 83 Mexican wolves in the wild. In 2021, there were an estimated 196 wolves in the wild, distributed across western New Mexico and eastern Arizona. 

On March 9, 2022, two new breeding pairs of Mexican gray wolves were released into the wild in the state of Chihuahua in northern Mexico, bringing the total number of Mexican gray wolves in the country to around 45 wild individuals. 

As of March 2023, the Mexican wolf population numbered at least 241 individuals across New Mexico and Arizona.

See also 
Wolves in the British Isles
Subspecies of Canis lupus
List of wolves
Mexican wolf

References 
 113: https://www.navratvlku.cz/skodni-udalost-postup-nahlaseni-skodni-udalosti-krok-za-krokem/

Bibliography